A number of ships have been named Akademik Karpinsky, including:

 , a cargo ship in service 1946–53
 , a research ship built in 1984

Ship names